Fevralsk is an urban locality (a work settlement) in Selemdzhinsky District of Amur Oblast, Russia, located between the Selemdzha River and its tributary the Byssa, about  northeast of Blagoveshchensk, the oblast's administrative center, and  southwest of Ekimchan, the administrative center of the district. Population:

History
The village of Fevralskoye was founded in February 1896 by settlers from Central Russia; the name was derived from the Russian word "" (fevral), meaning "February".

In 1974, the village became one of the most important support bases for construction of the Baikal-Amur Mainline (BAM). The station and the settlement were built by workers from Krasnoyarsk Krai; as part of the construction of the BAM, various sections and towns along the route were placed under the patronage of Komsomol brigades from different parts of the Soviet Union. Also some military divisions like DIVISION 21006 was situated at this town, when they were here, there almost was no houses in the soviet times. Biggest building was at 1978-1984.

In 1982, the village was given its current name and was granted urban-type settlement status.  Regular rail traffic on the BAM section from Tynda to Komsomolsk-on-Amur began in 1989.  Many inhabitants left the settlement after completion of the rail line.  However, in contrast to most other settlements along the BAM, the population has once again begun to increase, with a population of 4,904 according to the 2006 estimates.

Economy
Logging is conducted in the area around Fevralsk, mainly for export to nearby China.

Transportation

References

Sources

Urban-type settlements in Amur Oblast
Populated places established in 1896